The Thesaurus Linguae Latinae (abbreviated as ThLL or TLL) is a monumental dictionary of Latin founded on historical principles. It encompasses the Latin language from the time of its origin to the time of Isidore of Seville (died 636). 

The project was founded in 1894 by Eduard Wölfflin. At the time, the researchers thought it would take up to 20 years to complete the thesaurus. Today, it is expected that the work will be completed around the year 2050. The last fascicle of the P-volume appeared in 2010, and work is currently under way on both N and R. The institution that carries out the work of the dictionary is located in Munich, in the Bavarian Academy of Sciences and Humanities. Wölfflin described the entries in the TLL as "biographies" rather than definitions.

The offices of the TLL contain copies of all surviving Latin texts from 600 CE and earlier. The stacks contain boxes that collectively contain about 10 million slips on which is "every surviving piece of writing from the classical period", sorted into usage categories by word. For example, there are about 90,000 slips for the word 'et' and 50,000 for the word 'non'. These are used as source material to create entries for each word in the thesaurus.

In 2019, the TLL posted PDF copies of each entry on its website.

References

Citations

Sources 

Description from the Bayerische Akademie der Wissenschaften
Celebrations after fifty years of international cooperation on the TLL

External links
Thesaurus Linguae Latinae website
Chris Smith: Thesaurus Linguae Latinae: How the World’s Largest Latin Lexicon is brought to Life. In: De Gruyter Conversations, 05. Juli 2021.

Latin dictionaries
Research projects
Thesauri
19th-century Latin books
20th-century Latin books